Naomi Scott (born 6 May 1993) is an English actress and singer. Born in Hounslow, she rose to prominence for her performances in the teen comedy series Life Bites (2008–2009), the television film Lemonade Mouth (2011) and the science fiction series Terra Nova (2011). In 2015, Screen International selected her as one of their "Stars of Tomorrow". She achieved further recognition for starring as Princess Jasmine in Disney's musical live-action fantasy film Aladdin (2019), which earned her a Saturn Award nomination. She has also starred in the superhero film Power Rangers (2017) and the action comedy film Charlie's Angels (2019).

Early life
Scott was born on 6 May 1993 in Hounslow, London. She is of English and Indian descent. Her mother, Usha Scott (née Joshi), who was born in Uganda and emigrated to the United Kingdom at a young age, is of Indian Gujarati descent, while her father, Christopher Scott, is English. Scott also has an older brother, Joshua.

At eight years old, she and her family moved to Woodford, London, where both of her parents were pastors at the Bridge Church. She grew up listening to gospel and R&B music, specifically singers Kim Burrell, Mary Mary, and Kirk Franklin, and singing in church. She attended Davenant Foundation School in Loughton, Essex. She left the school halfway through taking her A-Levels to pursue her role in the series Terra Nova.

Career
Scott was discovered by British pop singer Kéllé Bryan from the girl group Eternal, who signed her as a client. She went to work with British songwriters and producers Xenomania. In 2014, the YouTube channel "Reload" published two videos featuring her, as part of their "Reload Sessions" series. Her first major acting role was a Disney Channel UK series Life Bites.

In 2010, she was cast as Mohini "Mo" Banjaree in the 2011 Disney Channel original film Lemonade Mouth, her first role in an American production. That same year she was cast as Maddy Shannon in the science fiction series Terra Nova, which premiered in September 2011 on Fox. The series was not renewed for a second season. In 2013, Scott appeared in the music video for the song "Hurricane", by her Lemonade Mouth co-star Bridgit Mendler. In August 2014, she independently released her debut EP Invisible Division. Scott was cast as Ryoko in Ridley Scott's The Martian. She filmed her scenes but most of them were removed from the final cut, effectively making her an "extra" in the film.

Screen International selected Scott as one of their 2015 Stars of Tomorrow. In October, she was cast in a co-leading role as Kimberly Hart, the Pink Ranger, in Power Rangers (2017), a film adaptation of the TV series of the same name. The film was released on 24 March 2017, and earned Scott a Teen Choice Award nomination. The film was met with mixed reviews upon release and was a box office disappointment, grossing $142 million worldwide against a budget of $105 million.

In 2019, Scott starred as Princess Jasmine in Aladdin, a live-action adaptation of Disney's 1992 animated film of the same name. Scott's casting over a "Middle Eastern or Arab actress" attracted comment. In his review for the San Francisco Chronicle, critic Mick LaSalle found Scott to be the "real star" of the film and that she "thrives and gives everything to her new power anthem ['Speechless']". Richard Roeper of Chicago Sun-Times wrote that Scott "absolutely sparkles" in her performance of "Speechless". For her role, Scott won the Teen Choice Award for Choice Movie Actress – Sci-Fi/Fantasy and also received a nomination for the Saturn Award for Best Supporting Actress. Aladdin was also commercially successful, grossing $1 billion at the box office.

Also in 2019, Scott starred as one of the three leads, alongside Kristen Stewart and Ella Balinska, in the action comedy Charlie's Angels, the third installment within the franchise of the same name, released in November. The film received mixed reviews from critics. In 2022, Scott played Olivia Lytton, a parliamentary aide, in the Netflix series Anatomy of a Scandal. She will also appear in the 2023 science fiction film Distant.

Personal life
Scott is a Christian. She is a UK ambassador to the Christian charity organisation Compassion International, sponsoring children and families living in poverty. She suffers from the skin condition eczema. She holds a black belt in karate, having studied it since her youth, which she credits as helpful with her roles in Power Rangers and Charlie's Angels.

In June 2014, Scott married English footballer Jordan Spence after four years of dating. The couple met at church when she was 16.

Filmography

Films

Television

Discography

Extended plays

Singles
As main artist

As featured artist

Other charted songs

Other appearances

Music videos

As a director

Awards and nominations

References

External links

 

1993 births
Living people
Actresses from London
British actresses of Indian descent
English child actresses
English child singers
English Christians
English film actresses
English people of Gujarati descent
English people of Ugandan descent
English television actresses
People from Hounslow
People from Woodford, London
21st-century English actresses
21st-century English women singers
21st-century English singers
21st-century Christians
Association footballers' wives and girlfriends